Viraraghava copper plates, dated 1225 CE, of Cochin, or Kottayam plates of Viraraghava Chakravartin, or Syrian Christian copper plate, or Iravi Kortann's Plate, describe the concession made by the local king Viraraghava to Syrian Christian merchant Iravikorttan, the chief of Manikkiramam (Manigiramam) in Makotaiyar Pattinam (modern Kodungallur).

Manigiramam, along with Anjuvannam and Ainurruvar, was one of major merchant guilds in medieval south India.

 Viraraghava is described as the descendant of certain Virakerala.
 Iravikorttan is described as "the Great Merchant of the Chera/Kerala Land"
The Four Temples (the Nalu Tali) are mentioned
 Witnesses mentioned
 Panniyur and Chokiram
 Venadu, Odanadu, Eranadu and Valluvanadu
 The scribe is named - Nampi Chateyan

References 

13th-century inscriptions
History of Kerala
Vatteluttu
Malayalam inscriptions
1225
Saint Thomas Christians
Kerala history inscriptions